Lake Sülüklü, for "Lake of the Leeches", is a freshwater lake located at Balkayası village of Ağın district in Elazığ Province, Turkey.

References

Suluklu (Elazıg)
Landforms of Elazığ Province